Webtoon (stylized in all caps) is a South Korean webtoon platform launched in 2004 by Naver Corporation, providing hosting for webtoons and compact digital comics. The platform is free, and is found both on the web at Webtoons.com and on mobile devices available for both iOS and Android.

The platform first launched in Korea as Naver Webtoon and then globally as Line Webtoon in July 2014, as the Naver brand is not well known outside of Korea and some of its services are also not available outside of the country. The service gained a large amount of traction during the late 2000s and early 2010s. In 2016, Naver's webtoon service entered the Japanese market as XOY and the Chinese market as Dongman Manhua. On December 18, 2018, Naver closed XOY and migrated all of its translated and original webtoons to Line Manga, its manga service that offers licensed manga. In 2019, Line Webtoon was changed to Webtoon in English; Spanish and French versions were launched.

The platform partners with creators to publish original content under the Webtoon Originals banner and hosts a number of other series on its self-publishing site CANVAS. Line Webtoon comics can be discovered through the "daily system" function, along with being read and downloaded for free on computers and both iOS and Android devices. In November 2020, Webtoon established a new subsidiary called Webtoon Studios for the purpose of licensing English-language properties. In August 2022 it was reported that Wattpad Webtoon studios announced that would expand with a new animation division.

History
Line Webtoon was founded by JunKoo Kim in 2004, under the name "Webtoon", after he watched the manhwa industry crash in the late 1990s and early 2000s. Kim, who grew up reading manga and superhero manhwa, was looking for a way to get new comics created because he found that there were very few new comics coming out. Kim theorized that tall, scrollable comics would work well on the World Wide Web, as users were already used to scrolling through web pages. Because of this unusual layout, Kim initially had difficulty finding artists to create webtoons on his service, but he found that manhwa was willing to do something different because of the poor state of the local manhwa industry. In 2013, Webtoon launched 'Page Profit Share' (PPS), which offered the artist a share of the advertising revenue for the first time. After the purchase of Wattpad in early 2021 by Naver Corporation, both companies started to work together under Naver's content division. Webtoon now features webcomics such as: Lore Olympus, unOrdinary, True Beauty, Space Boy, and Gourmet Hound.

Prior to the existence of Line Webtoon, printed comics were the standard. However, in 1997, Korea was hit by a major financial crisis: the IMF Crisis. Due to the impact the crisis had on the economy, many people could only afford to rent and not buy comics. The sales of manhwa (Korean comics) plummeted during this time. When high-speed internet was introduced by the Korean government during this same period, comic fans could then scan, translate, and share both manhwa and Japanese manga for free. This led to a decline in comic rental shops, and created an opening for the beginning of Line Webtoon.

Global launch
On July 2, 2014, the Line Webtoon website and mobile app were launched worldwide, allowing international artists to upload their own works to the service. Hundreds of webtoons are available in the self-publishing section of Webtoon, known as CANVAS, where artists can be paid based on page views. JunKoo Kim, Director and Head of the Line Webtoon Division at the time of the launch, stated that a partnership with established and up-and-coming American creators would serve to "expand [Line Webtoon's] selection of titles and help [the creators] expand their fan base." Naver Corporation selected 42 webtoons (including Noblesse, Tower of God, and The God of High School) and one new webtoon by an American artist to be available on the service in English at launch. According to 148 Apps, the service offered "plenty of content" at launch, as seven to ten webtoons were updated each day and the webtoons spanned various genres.

Partnerships
In April 2013, Naver Webtoon created a Profit Page Share program. This compensation program that allow artists to get a larger profit through advertisements or their own personal stores, but is shared between NHN Corp and the artists themselves.

In 2015, Line Webtoon partnered with American comics veteran Stan Lee, Image Comics co-founder Marc Silvestri, and make-up artist Michelle Phan in order to promote their service. Silvestri brought his long-running comics series Cyberforce to the platform. Various other established American comic book artists and cartoonists have also partnered with Line Webtoon over time, including Dean Haspiel (New Brooklyn), Katie Cook (Nothing Special), Seth Kushner and Shamus Beyale (The Brooklynite), and Tracy J. Butler (Lackadaisy).

In September 2016, Line Webtoon partnered with the Patreon crowdfunding service, incorporating a "Patreon button" in the "Discover" portion of the website. This function creates an easier channel for readers and artists to mutually communicate. Naver invested US$3.6 million and $1,000 every following month for webtoon creators who reached a certain threshold of activity and popularity with a Patreon page. One month later, Naver signed with the Creative Artists Agency for film and television opportunities in the United States.

Line Webtoon also partnered with DeviantArt in the second half of 2016, in the form of the "Artist Alley Tour". The companies were active at four Comic Cons: Boston Comic Con, Baltimore Comic Con, Rose City Comic Con, and New York Comic Con. Here, Line Webtoon and DeviantArt held discussion panels, "Artist Alley Sponsorships", live draw events, influencer and creator demonstration areas, and on-site contests.

In 2017 Line Webtoon and Legendary Comics expanded their partnership with the addition of John Barrowman's Acursian and season 2 of Firebrand.

In 2018 included partnering with Noble Transmission and Common for the new Caster series.

In 2019 Webtoon's digital content subsidiary Studio LICO collaboratively produced with Big Hit Entertainment to release Save Me as part of the latter's BTS Universe (BU) which revolves around the output of South Korean boy band BTS.

On October 15, 2019, Crunchyroll and Line Webtoon announced a partnership to produce animated works of Line Webtoon's catalog. The two will team up to tackle the distribution, licensing, and retail of the series produced from the partnership.

In May 2020, it was announced that Webtoon was being transferred to Naver Webtoon Corp.

On January 19, 2021, Webtoon's parent company Naver acquired the popular user-written story site Wattpad. Wattpad will be partnering with Webtoon—which it had already done in its 2020 Watty Awards Contest—to provide more opportunities for creators.

In June 2021, Wattpad and Webtoon announced that the companies will merge their studio divisions to create Wattpad Webtoon Studios.

In August 2021, it was announced that Webtoon would be partnering with DC Entertainment to create standalone webcomics that “will appeal to all fans, without the need to know or read any previous stories.” The series are being adapted by Webtoon creators instead of established DC creators. Line Webtoon founder and CEO Junkoo Kim put it this way: "DC has allowed us to create content with their characters and world. The writers of Webtoon are creating content based on DC characters." The first announced DC collaboration is a Batman-oriented title, Wayne Family Adventures.

Userbase
The userbase of Webtoon grew rapidly after the service was released globally, with 10 million people reading on the platform daily and 35 million people monthly. In Asia, several webtoons receive 5 million views per week. In 2016, 42% of the webtoon creators on Line Webtoon were female, as were 50% of its 6 million active daily readers. 75% of the users in North America are 24 or younger and 64% are female.

As of July 1, 2019, Webtoon has grown to more than 100 billion views annually.

Contests
Naver Corporation has held various comics competitions through its Webtoon service. In 2015, Line launched the "Challenge League", a recurring competition where amateur artists have the chance to become an "official Line webtoon artist", as well as win tens of thousands of US Dollars. Over 19,000 people joined the first English-language Challenge League in February 2015, which was won by Stephen McCranie's Space Boy. Local Challenge Weeks were also held; the first Thai Challenge League was held in April 2015 and had a grand prize of 1 million baht.

In June 2015, Naver Corporation hosted the Science Fiction Comics Contest, a global competition with a grand prize of US$30,000. JunKoo Kim called science fiction, the theme of the competition, "both the broadest and fastest-growing area in comics and entertainment, [and thus] a natural fit as the genre for our second comics contest." This contest had over 800 entrants and was won by Srinitybeast's Overdrive.

In November 2018, Webtoon hosted their Discover Creator Contest. The winner, Kris Nguyen's Cape of Spirits, received a grand total of US$80,000 and an exclusive contract for the series.

On February 28, 2020 "The Short Story Contest" was announced. Running from April 30 to June 30, the contest was split into two categories: "Heart" and "Brain". The grand prize winners of each category would get US$15,000, an animated short, and a featured contract, with the subsequent winners being Marvin W.'s The Monster Under My Bed for "Heart" and Kotopopi's The Ladder for "Brain". The grand prize, silver, and bronze contest winners were published in two anthologies: The HEART Anthology, which released in September 2020, and the BRAIN Anthology, which released in October 2020.

Between April 2020 and July 2020, Webtoon ran an interactive contest series titled Webtoon GREENLiGHT wherein nine titles were selected and pitched to readers. The readers then voted (by liking the series' episodes) on which series would be "greenlit" as new Original series. Within one week, each series had to reach a record threshold of 60,000 likes on its third episode in order to be "greenlit" for publication. All nine series succeeded and are set to be released in 2021.

In the summer of 2022 Webtoon stated a new contest for their users to create an action comic called Call to Action where the winner got US$50,000 and a chance to be a Webtoon original.

Adaptations

Other Media into Webtoons
Some webtoons on the platform are adaptations of YA novels, including:
Renée Ahdieh's The Wrath & the Dawn
Rebecca Schaeffer's Not Even Bones
Hanna Alkaf's The Weight of the Sky
Victoria Lee's The Fever King
Nicki Pau Preto's Crown of Feathers 

Many South Korean webtoons on the platform are adaptations of web novels, including titles such as:
The Omniscient Reader's Viewpoint written by a Korean author duo under the alias Sing Shong and drawn by Sleepy-C from REDICE Studios
The Remarried Empress (which also became a mobile game and audio drama, and was collected and published in paperback format by Yen Press's Ize Press imprint)
So I Married the Anti-Fan (based on this novel, which also got adapted into both a Chinese film and a Korean TV series)
Like Wind on a Dry Branch

On June 23, 2021, it was announced that 2018 film On Your Wedding Day will be adapted into a webtoon, to be serialized on webtoon platforms Naver and Kakao.

A webtoon based on TV series Our Beloved Summer is under production. The webtoon, a prequel about the high school days of the two main characters of the TV series (Choi Woong and Kuk Yeon-su), is scheduled to be released on Naver Webtoon in the fall of 2021.

Batman: Wayne Family Adventures, a series based on the Batman family from DC Comics began serialization in September 2021.

A webtoon based on the DC comics character Vixen, Vixen: NYC, is also being produced.

Webtoons into Other Media

Published Format (English)
Space Boy was published in paperback by Dark Horse Books.

Hooky was published in paperback by Clarion Books.

Lore Olympus was published in paperback by Random House Worlds.

Yen Press, via its imprint Ize Press, has collected and published several other of Webtoon's titles as paperbacks, including:
7Fates: Chakho
Dark Moon: The Blood Altar  
My Gently Raised Beast
The Boxer
The Remarried Empress (see above)
The Star Seekers
The World After the Fall

Rocketship Entertainment has collected and published several of Webtoon's titles, including:
#Blessed
1000
Adventures of God
Assassin Roommate
Brothers Bond
Cupid's Arrows
Darbi
Girls Have a Blog
Late Bloomer
Let's Play
Live Forever
Metaphorical HER
Outrage
Spirits: The Soul Collector
Stan Lee's Backchannel
The Croaking
Urban Animal
undeadEd
Wolfsbane

Webtoon, after its acquisition of Wattpad, announced in 2021 a new imprint, Webtoon Unscrolled. Through it, Webtoon will be publishing print editions of its own titles, including:
Boyfriends
Cursed Princess Club
Doom Breaker
Everything Is Fine
True Beauty
Tower of God

Film and Animation 

Various movies, Korean dramas, animated series, and video games have been produced based on webtoons released on Naver Corporation's service. According to JunKoo Kim in 2014, "a total of 189 books, videos and games based on Naver webtoons have either been produced or are in the process of being made." However, Line Webtoon's first entry of video content in the United States came in 2016, in the form of an animated film based on Noblesse.

On November 7, 2016, Air Seoul announced that it had collaborated with Line Webtoon to produce pre-flight safety demonstration videos. Some of the works featured in these include Denma, The Sound of Heart, and Noblesse.

In July 2019, Webtoon produced their first promotional animated short series from one of their exclusive originals, My Giant Nerd Boyfriend. A second set of promotions, from the work Let's Play, was released in September, 2019.

In October 2019, Crunchyroll revealed on Instagram that it would be collaborating with Webtoon to release animated series based on selected webtoons as a part of its "Crunchyroll Originals" project. In February 2020, Crunchyroll announced that Noblesse, Tower of God, and The God of High School were chosen for later release.

List of Adapted Webtoons
Below is a list of Naver Webtoon titles adapted into television series, web series, and films.

Awards and nominations

See also
Line Manga
Studio N, a film studio that produces drama adaptations of Naver Webtoon series
Tapas (website)

Footnotes

References

External links
Webtoon
Naver Webtoon
XOY
Dongman Manhua

Webtoon publishing companies
Webcomic publishing companies
Naver Corporation
Internet properties established in 2004
2004 establishments in South Korea